Mijoshki Antwon Evans (September 6, 1972 – February 4, 2021) was an American football player.

Career
Evans played collegiately at the University of Alabama at Birmingham in Birmingham, Alabama with whom he was a four-year starter. Evans was signed as an undrafted free agent in 1995 by the Houston Oilers and stayed with them during the franchise's move to Tennessee. In 1999, the Titans made it to Super Bowl XXXIV in which Evans started. However, they lost to the Kurt Warner-led St. Louis Rams. In 2000, Evans served a one-year suspension for violating the league's substance abuse policy. In 2002, Evans signed with The New York Jets with whom he spent the last three seasons of his NFL career.

Evans died in February 2021 at the age of 48 after a battle with kidney cancer.

References

External links
NFL Players Biography

1972 births
2021 deaths
African-American players of American football
American football defensive tackles
Deaths from kidney cancer
Houston Oilers players
New York Jets players
People from Valley, Alabama
Place of death missing
Players of American football from Alabama
Tennessee Oilers players
Tennessee Titans players
UAB Blazers football players
20th-century African-American sportspeople
21st-century African-American sportspeople
Deaths from cancer in Georgia (U.S. state)